Dong Xa may refer to

 Đồng Xá, a village in Bắc Kạn Province, in Vietnam
 Dong Xa, a village in Binh Giang District of Hải Dương province, Vietnam - site of 2009 Jimmy Carter Habitat for Humanity work project